Cozumel International Airport  is an international airport in the Caribbean island of Cozumel, Quintana Roo, Mexico. It handles national and international air traffic for the city of San Miguel, Cozumel and handles hundreds of thousands of tourists on a year-round basis. The airport has two runways.

As with the other nine airports in the Mexican southeast region, Cozumel International Airport is operated by the ASUR Airport Group.

In 2003, the terminal was renovated and expanded. The airport is equipped with six boarding gates.

In 2020, the airport handled 268,290 passengers and in 2021 it handled 531,675 passengers, according to Grupo Aeroportuario del Sureste.

The airport has the exclusive VIP lounge, the Caral VIP Lounge.

Airlines and destinations

Statistics

Passengers

Busiest routes

See also 

List of the busiest airports in Mexico

References

External links
 

Airports in Quintana Roo
Cozumel